Tímea Babos and Andrea Sestini Hlaváčková were the defending champions, but neither player chose to defend their title.

Asia Muhammad and Maria Sanchez won the title defeating Darija Jurak and Xenia Knoll 6–4, 6–3 in the final.

Seeds

Draw

Draw

References
Main Draw

Coupe Banque Nationale - Doubles
2018 Doubles
2018 in Canadian tennis